Anglo-Maratha Wars may refer to:

 First Anglo-Maratha War (1775–1782)
 Second Anglo-Maratha War (1803–1805)
 Third Anglo-Maratha War (1817–1819)
 Gwalior campaign (1843)

History of Maharashtra
Wars involving India
Wars involving the British East India Company